Spalangia endius is an insect of the family Pteromalidae. The scientific name was published in 1839.

References 

Pteromalidae